The Webberville Solar Farm, is a 35 MWp (30 MWAC)  photovoltaic array in located in Webberville, Texas, only about 6 miles east of the Tesla Gigafactory 5. It is expected to generate 61 GWh in the first year of operation, and 1.4 billion kWh over its 25 year life. Operation began on December 20, 2011, with a ribbon cutting by Austin mayor Lee Leffingwell on January 6, 2012.

The project was constructed by RES Americas, who will operate the plant for five years. In 2012, SunEdison sold the plant to MetLife and Longsol Holdings, but will operate the plant for 20 years upon the expiration of the responsibilities of RES Americas.  Austin Energy is purchasing the power generated under a 25 year PPA, and has a goal of generating 35% of power consumed from renewable resources by 2020.

Source:Webberville Solar Farm

Electricity Production

See also

Solar power in Texas

References

External links
Website

Energy infrastructure completed in 2012
Solar power stations in Texas
Photovoltaic power stations in the United States
MetLife
SunEdison